is a Buddhist temple of the Rinzai sect built in Mino Province (modern-day Gifu, Gifu Prefecture, Japan). It is a branch temple of Myōshin-ji in Kyoto, Kyoto Prefecture, Japan.

After entering the main gate there are six temples: three are located on the left of the main path (Tentaku-in, Kaizen-in, Unryu-in) and three are on the right (Zuiun-in, Kakusei-in, Gaun-in). The graves of Saitō Myōchin and Toki Shigeyori are also located on the compound.

See also 
 For an explanation of terms concerning Japanese Buddhism, Japanese Buddhist art, and Japanese Buddhist temple architecture, see the Glossary of Japanese Buddhism.

References

External links
Zuiryū-ji official site

Images 

Buildings and structures in Gifu
Buddhist temples in Gifu Prefecture
Jingū-ji